Štatenberg is a settlement in the Municipality of Makole in northeastern Slovenia. It lies in the hills above the left bank of the Dravinja River. The area is part of the traditional region of Styria. It is now included with the rest of the municipality in the Drava Statistical Region.

It gets its name from Štatenberg Mansion, built in the late 17th century by the Counts of Attems east of the settlement.

Prior to World War II, the mansion was the property of the Neumann family of Zagreb.

References

External links
 Štatenberg at Geopedia

Populated places in the Municipality of Makole